Bernau bei Berlin (English Bernau by Berlin, commonly named Bernau) is a German town in the Barnim district.

History
Archaeological excavations of Mesolithic-era sites indicate that this area has been inhabited since about 8800 BC. The city was first mentioned in 1232. The reasons for its founding are not known. According to a legend, Albert I of Brandenburg permitted the founding of the city in 1140 because of the good beer which was offered to him. Beer was brewed with water from the river Panke. Therefore, it was forbidden by law to pollute this river with waste and excrement  when brewing took place.

Bernau had its boom years before the Thirty Years' War. Large parts of the defensive wall with town gate and wet moats are relics of that time. These helped Bernau defend itself successfully against attackers, e.g. the Hussites in 1432. Following the plague and war, Bernau became poor and bleak. Frederick I of Prussia settled 25 Huguenot families (craftsmen, farmers, traders, and scientists) in 1699.

In 1842 a railway line was opened. One of the first electrical suburban railway lines in the world began operation in 1924. This line of the Berlin S-Bahn connected Bernau with the Stettiner Bahnhof (today Berlin Nordbahnhof) in Berlin. The ADGB Trade Union School (Bundesschule des Allgemeinen Deutschen Gewerkschaftsbundes), designed by Bauhaus director Hannes Meyer, opened in 1930. It was included as part of the World Heritage Site the Bauhaus and its Sites in Weimar, Dessau and Bernau in July 2017. The Waldsiedlung (engl. residential area in the wood) is a district of the city where the political leaders of the GDR lived isolated from the people.

Demography

Main sights

Museums
The museum of local history has two locations. One is the town gate with the former prison Hungerturm (Tower of Hunger). It is one of formerly three town gates, that were part of the defensive wall. Today, armour and instruments of torture of the Middle Ages are shown there. Common furniture from several epochs, and utensils of the executioner are exhibited in the Henkerhaus (executioner's house) to demonstrate life in the small town.

In 2005 the Wolf Kahlen Museum opened. Media art from over 40 years is shown.

In 2005 Annelie Grund created the monument for the victims of the witch hunt.

Buildings
The church St. Marien (Late Gothic style) dominates the skyline of the town.
The nave was built in the 15th century.

Large parts of the defensive walls and wet moats of the Middle Ages are preserved.
The defensive wall is supplemented by several lookout houses, the Pulverturm (armoury) and a town gate.

Until the 1960s the city centre, enclosed by the defensive wall, consisted of small old buildings with timber framed construction. Most of them were in a bad state because no funds were available in the GDR to renovate these buildings. It was decided to change Bernau into an exemplary city of socialist architecture. Nearly all the old houses were torn down in the 1960s and 1970s and new so-called Plattenbauten (buildings constructed of prefabricated concrete slabs) were built. The new houses had a maximum of four storeys to fit in with the architecture to the historic structure of the city.

The former ADGB school is located in the northeast of the town. It is the largest building in the Bauhaus style besides the Bauhaus itself.

Transport

The line S2 of the Berlin S-Bahn (suburban railway) connects Bernau with Berlin Friedrichstraße's station, in the center of that city
Regional rail services connect Bernau with Eberswalde, Schwedt, Stralsund, Frankfurt (Oder) in northbound direction and with Berlin Hauptbahnhof, Berlin Lichtenberg and Elsterwerda in southbound direction. Long-distance trains go to Stralsund, Dortmund,
Düsseldorf, Dresden and Amsterdam.

The Bundesautobahn A11 from Berlin to Prenzlau and Szczecin has the two exits Bernau Nord (number 15) and Bernau Süd (number 16).

Twin towns – sister cities

Bernau bei Berlin is twinned with:
 Champigny-sur-Marne, France
 Meckenheim, Germany
 Skwierzyna, Poland

Notable people

Honorary citizen 
Konrad Wolf (1925–1982), film director, President of the Academy of Arts, was the first city commander of Bernau after the Second World War (April 1945) at the age of 19, honorary citizen since 1975

Sons and daughters of the city 

 Charlotte Mäder (born 1905), athlete
 Hans-Jürgen Buchner (born 1944), musician and composer
 Jeanette Biedermann (born 1980),  entertainer

People associated with Bernau 

 Marianne Buggenhagen (born 1953), several times Paralympics winner, lives in Bernau 
 Wolf Kahlen (born 1940), performance, object and media artist, opened his museum in Bernau in 2005
 Günther Maleuda (1931–2012), politician (DBD), President of the GDR in the turn-time of the GDR
 Hannes Meyer (1889–1954), architect, built the Bundesschule des Allgemeine Deutscher Gewerkschaftsbundes (ADGB Trade Union School) in Bernau from 1928 to 1930
  (born 1961), youth judge in Bernau
 Johanna Olbrich (1926–2004), spy, lived out her final years in Bernau

See also
Liepnitzsee

References

External links
 
  

Localities in Barnim